Jalal Khan is town and union council of the Kachhi District in the Balochistan province of Pakistan. It is located at 29°2'0"N 67°44'0"E and has an altitude of 89 metres (295 feet).

References

Populated places in Kachhi District
Union councils of Balochistan, Pakistan